The women's 48 kilograms (Extra lightweight) competition at the 2018 Asian Games in Jakarta was held on 29 August at the Jakarta Convention Center Assembly Hall.

Jeong Bo-kyeong of South Korea won the gold medal.

Schedule
All times are Western Indonesia Time (UTC+07:00)

Results

Main bracket

Repechage

References

External links
 
 Official website
 Official website

W48
Judo at the Asian Games Women's Extra Lightweight
Asian W48